Port au Port West-Aguathuna-Felix Cove is a small town located on the Port au Port Peninsula of the Island of Newfoundland, Canada. The nearest large service area is Stephenville.

The town was created in 1970 by amalgamating the small villages of Port au Port West, Aguathuna and Felix Cove. Its post office began on September 11, 1964. The first Post Mistress was Reisa Gabriel.

Aguathuna

The area grew from workers at the nearby limestone mine site at Jack of Clubs Cove. The Dominion Iron and Steel Company opened a quarry there in 1911. The quarry's manager, Arthur House, wanted to rename the cove from Jack of Clubs Cove as it would never have been treated with serious respect. The then Archbishop M.F. Howley suggested Aguathuna believing it to be a Beothuk word for white stone. That name was chosen by residents over the other alternative, Limeville.

Demographics 

See also
List of cities and towns in Newfoundland and Labrador

References and notes

Populated coastal places in Canada
Towns in Newfoundland and Labrador